William Jefferson "Little Bill" Sowders (November 29, 1864 – February 2, 1951) was a professional baseball player.  He was a right-handed pitcher over parts of three seasons (1888–1890) with the Boston Beaneaters and Pittsburgh Alleghenys.  For his career, he compiled a 29–30 record in 71 appearances, with a 3.34 earned run average and 205 strikeouts.

Sowders was born in Louisville, Kentucky, and later died in Indianapolis at the age of 86.  Two of his brothers, John Sowders and Len Sowders, also played Major League Baseball.

See also
 List of Major League Baseball annual saves leaders

References

1864 births
1951 deaths
Major League Baseball pitchers
Baseball players from Louisville, Kentucky
Pittsburgh Alleghenys players
Boston Beaneaters players
Burials at Crown Hill Cemetery
19th-century baseball players
Minneapolis Millers (baseball) players
St. Paul Saints (Northwestern League) players
Omaha Omahogs players
Omaha Lambs players
Milwaukee Brewers (minor league) players
Milwaukee Creams players
Fort Wayne (minor league baseball) players
Joliet Giants players
Jacksonville Lunatics players
Washington Little Senators players
Saginaw Lumbermen players
New Castle Salamanders players